Arne Rustadstuen (14 December 1905 – 25 April 1978) was a Norwegian Nordic skier who competed in nordic combined and cross-country skiing in the 1930s. He won a bronze medal at the 1932 Winter Olympics in Lake Placid, New York in the 50 km.

In addition, he won a complete set of medals at FIS Nordic World Ski Championships. In 1930, Rustadstuen won the 17 km cross-country event and earned a silver in the 50 km cross-country event while he earned a bronze in the Nordic combined in 1931. Rustadstuen won the men's 18 km at the Holmenkollen ski festival in 1934 and 1935. Because of his successes, Rustadstuen was awarded the Holmenkollen medal in 1935.

Cross-country skiing results
All results are sourced from the International Ski Federation (FIS).

Olympic Games
 1 medal – (1 bronze)

World Championships
 2 medals – (1 gold, 1 silver)

References

 - click Holmenkollmedaljen for downloadable pdf file 
 - click Vinnere for downloadable pdf file

External links
 Cross-country profile
 Nordic combined profile

1905 births
1978 deaths
Cross-country skiers at the 1932 Winter Olympics
Cross-country skiers at the 1936 Winter Olympics
Holmenkollen medalists
Holmenkollen Ski Festival winners
Norwegian male Nordic combined skiers
Norwegian male cross-country skiers
Olympic cross-country skiers of Norway
Olympic bronze medalists for Norway
Olympic medalists in cross-country skiing
FIS Nordic World Ski Championships medalists in cross-country skiing
FIS Nordic World Ski Championships medalists in Nordic combined
Medalists at the 1932 Winter Olympics
20th-century Norwegian people